Barbato is an Italian surname. Notable people with the surname include: 

Andrea Barbato (1934–1996), Italian journalist, politician, author and screenwriter
Elisabetta Barbato (1921–2014), Italian operatic soprano
John Barbato (born 1934), American mobster
Johnny Barbato (born 1992), American baseball pitcher
Joseph Barbato (born 1994), French footballer
Nicola Barbato (1856-1923), Italian medical doctor, socialist and politician
Paola Barbato (born 1971), Italian writer
Silvio Barbato (1959–2009), Italian-Brazilian opera conductor and composer

Italian-language surnames